The bullseye or bull's eye has, since 1833, been the name for the center of a target and, by extension, since 1857, has been given to any throw, toss, or shot that hits the center.

In a further development, success in an endeavor in which there is such inherent difficulty that most people are far more likely to choose, do, or identify something that is either unfortunately only close to or dismissively far from the ideal or necessary thing to choose can be called "hitting the bull's eye."

The center of the target may have come to be called the bull's eye from the practice of English archers who, both to develop and to exhibit their skills, would attempt to shoot an arrow through the eye socket of a bull's skull.

In some archery traditions the term "gold" is used in preference to "bullseye".  In target archery, hitting the center ring of an international target is worth 10 points, or 9 points if it's an Imperial target.

In Japanese archery, known as Kyūdō, the bullseye is called "zuboshi". The term is also used as idiomatic slang just as it is in English, to note that someone has done or said something that hits "right on the nose."
 
In darts, the bullseye is located 5 foot 8 inches (1.73m) above the floor.  Before the start of a match players will usually throw closest to the bullseye to decide who has the advantage of throwing first. An inner bullseye (sometimes referred to as a "double bullseye" in amateur play) is a smaller, inner circle and counts for 50 points while an outer bull is worth 25 points.  In the World Grand Prix, which has a double start format, an inner bullseye can begin a leg. In the dart golf game, the bullseye is used as part of a three-part tie breaker that also includes the treble twenty.

Hitting three bullseyes in darts is known as the "Alan Evans shot".

See also
 Bullseye (shooting competition)
 Roundel, a round shape in heraldry
Bullseye, a British game show based on darts
Porthole

References

Archery
Darts terminology
Sports targets